Jon Hul is an American pin-up artist known for his photorealistic paintings and drawings of models who have appeared in Playboy magazine.

Biography
Jon Hul (Born May 30, 1957) in Pittsburgh, Pennsylvania, and later grew up in California and Nevada. He attended Valley High School in Las Vegas, where he studied ceramics, oil painting, watercolors, and commercial design, graduating in 1976.

He is not a college graduate, and is mainly self-taught at his craft. He has noted as early influences the artists Salvador Dalí, Frank Frazetta, Alberto Vargas, M. C. Escher, Pablo Picasso, and later Patrick Nagel, Olivia De Berardinis and Hajime Sorayama.

In 1987 he decided to become a full-time artist, and to focus on fatherhood.

Many of his art pieces were rendered on different substrates, as he uses the media of watercolor, acrylic paint, oil paints, and pencil.

Books
 The Art of Jon Hul (2003)
 The Jon Hul Sketchbook Volume One (2006) 
 Jon Hul Gallery (2014)

References
 Official Web Site
 Chester, Tony. The Art of Jon Hul book review, Concatenation.org, retrieved December 4, 2006

External links
 Official site

Living people
Pin-up artists
1957 births
People from Pittsburgh